South Cedar Township is one of 24 townships in Saunders County, in the U.S. state of Nebraska. The population was 240 at the 2020 census. A 2021 estimate placed the township's population at 247.

See also
County government in Nebraska

References

External links
City-Data.com

Townships in Saunders County, Nebraska
Townships in Nebraska